The notchlip redhorse (Moxostoma collapsum) is a species of ray-finned fish in the genus Moxostoma.

Relationship with humans 
The world record notchlip redhorse stands at 1lb 4oz taken from the Green River in North Carolina in 2018.

Footnotes

References

Moxostoma
Fish described in 1870